Zacheus Chase was a Michigan politician.

He was elected as the mayor of the City of Flint in 1880 serving a 1-year term.

References

1837 births
1900 deaths
Michigan Republicans
Mayors of Flint, Michigan
19th-century American politicians